Perebory is a microdistrict of the city of Rybinsk, Yaroslavl Oblast, Russia, situated near the confluence of the Volga and Sheksna Rivers.

References

Rybinsk